The Kazakh Soviet Socialist Republic, also known as Soviet Kazakhstan, the Kazakh SSR, or simply Kazakhstan, was one of the transcontinental constituent republics of the Soviet Union (USSR) from 1936 to 1991 in northern Central Asia. It was created on 5 December 1936 from the Kazakh ASSR, an autonomous republic of the Russian SFSR.

At  in area, it was the second-largest republic in the USSR, after the Russian SFSR. Its capital was Alma-Ata (today known as Almaty). During its existence as a Soviet Socialist Republic, it was ruled by the Communist Party of the Kazakh SSR (QKP).

On 25 October 1990, the Supreme Soviet of the Kazakh SSR declared its sovereignty on its soil. QKP first secretary Nursultan Nazarbayev was elected president in April of that year – a role he remained in until 2019.

The Kazakh SSR was renamed the Republic of Kazakhstan on 10 December 1991, which declared its independence six days later, as the last republic to secede from the USSR on 16 December 1991. The Soviet Union was officially disbanded on 26 December 1991 by the Soviet of the Republics. The Republic of Kazakhstan, the legal successor to the Kazakh SSR, was admitted to the United Nations on 2 March 1992.

Name
The republic was named after the Kazakh people, Turkic-speaking former nomads who sustained a powerful khanate in the region before Russian and later Soviet domination. The Soviet Union's spaceport, now known as the Baikonur Cosmodrome, was located in this republic at Tyuratam, and the secret town of Leninsk (now known as Baikonur) was constructed to accommodate its personnel.

History

Formation
Established on 26 August 1920, it was initially called Kirghiz ASSR (Kirghiz Autonomous Soviet Socialist Republic) and was a part of the Russian SFSR. On 15–19 April 1925, it was renamed Kazak ASSR (subsequently Kazakh ASSR) and on 5 December 1936 it was elevated to the status of a Union-level republic, Kazakh Soviet Socialist Republic.

On 19 February 1925 Filipp Goloshchyokin was appointed First Secretary of the Communist Party in the newly created Kazakh Autonomous Socialist Soviet Republic. From 1925 to 1933 he ran the Kazakh ASSR with virtually no outside interference.  He played a prominent part in the construction of the Turkestan-Siberia railway, which was constructed to open up Kazakhstan's mineral wealth.

After Joseph Stalin ordered the forced collectivization of agriculture throughout the Soviet Union, Goloshchyokin ordered that Kazakhstan's largely nomadic population was to be forced to settle in collective farms. This caused the deadly Kazakh famine of 1930–1933 in Kazakhstan which killed between 1 and 2 million people.

In 1937 the first major deportation of an ethnic group in the Soviet Union began, the removal of the Korean population from the Russian Far East to Kazakhstan. Over 170,000 people were forcibly relocated.

Over one million political prisoners from various parts of the Soviet Union passed through the Karaganda Corrective Labor Camp (KarLag) between 1931 and 1959, with an unknown number of deaths.

During the 1950s and 1960s, Soviet citizens were urged to settle in the Virgin Lands of the Kazakh Soviet Socialist Republic. The influx of immigrants, mostly Russians, skewed the ethnic mixture and enabled non-Kazakhs to outnumber natives.  As a result, the use of the Kazakh language declined but has started to experience a revival since independence, both as a result of its resurging popularity in law and business and the growing proportion of Kazakhs. The other nationalities included Ukrainians, Germans, Jews, Belarusians, Koreans and others; Germans at the time of independence formed about 8% of the population, the largest concentration of Germans in the entire Soviet Union. Kazakh independence has caused many of these newcomers to emigrate.

Dissolution
Following the dismissal of Dinmukhamed Konayev, the First Secretary of the Communist Party of Kazakhstan by the last Soviet general secretary, Mikhail Gorbachev, riots broke out for four days between 16 and 19 December 1986 known as Jeltoqsan by student demonstrators in Brezhnev Square in the capital city, Alma-Ata. Approximately 168–200 civilians were killed in the uprising. The events then spilled over to Shymkent, Pavlodar, Karaganda and Taldykorgan.

On 25 March 1990, Kazakhstan held its first elections with Nursultan Nazarbayev, the chairman of the Supreme Soviet elected as its first president. Later that year on 25 October, it then declared sovereignty. The republic participated in a referendum to preserve the union in a different entity with 94.1% voted in favour. It did not happen when hardline communists in Moscow took control of the government in August. Nazarbayev then condemned the failed coup.

As a result of those events, the Kazakh SSR was renamed to the Republic of Kazakhstan on 10 December 1991. It declared independence on December 16 (the fifth anniversary of Jeltoqsan), becoming the last Soviet constituency to secede. Its capital was the site of the Alma-Ata Protocol on 21 December 1991 that dissolved the Soviet Union and formed the Commonwealth of Independent States in its place which Kazakhstan joined. The Soviet Union officially ceased to exist as a sovereign state on 26 December 1991 and Kazakhstan became an internationally recognized independent state.

On 28 January 1993, the new Constitution of Kazakhstan was officially adopted.

Population

According to the 1897 census, the earliest census taken in the region, Kazakhs constituted 81.7% of the total population (3,392,751 people) within the territory of contemporary Kazakhstan. The Russian population in Kazakhstan was 454,402, or 10.95% of total population; there were 79,573 Ukrainians (1.91%); 55,984 Tatars (1.34%); 55,815 Uyghurs (1.34%); 29,564 Uzbeks (0.7%); 11,911 Moldovans (0.28%); 4,888 Dungans (0.11%); 2,883 Turkmens; 2,613 Germans; 2,528 Bashkirs; 1,651 Jews; and 1,254 Poles.

Famines 
The most significant factors that shaped the ethnic composition of the population of Kazakhstan were the 1920s and 1930s famines. According to different estimates of the effects of the  Kazakh famine of 1930–1933, up to 40% of Kazakhs (indigenous ethnic group) either died of starvation or fled the territory. Official government census data report the contraction of Kazakh population from 3.6 million in 1926, to 2.3 million in 1939.

Economy
Upon the start of the Second World War, many large factories were relocated to the Kazakh SSR.

The Semipalatinsk Nuclear Test Site and Baikonur Cosmodrome were also built here.

After the war, the Virgin Lands Campaign was started in 1953. This was led by Nikita Khrushchev, with the goal of developing the vast lands of the republic and helping to boost Soviet agricultural yields. However it did not work as promised, the campaign was eventually abandoned in the 1960s.

Culture
In the early days of the Soviet Union, Kazakh culture was both developed and restrained, and later many Kazakh cultural figures were imprisoned, exiled, or killed in Joseph Stalin's purges. However, after the Stalinist era, Nikita Khrushchev's efforts to reinvigorate internationalism and furtherly weaken Kazakh culture were controversial in the Kazakh SSR. Kazakhs viewed his internationalist goals as a call for "Russification".

Notes

References

Further reading
  Cameron, Sarah. The Hungry Steppe: Famine, Violence, and the Making of Soviet Kazakhstan (Cornell University Press,  2018) online review

External links 
Kazakhstan: Seven Year Plan for Prosperity by Dinmukhamed Konayev, a 1958 Soviet propaganda booklet

 
Communism in Kazakhstan
Republics of the Soviet Union
States and territories established in 1936
States and territories disestablished in 1991
1936 establishments in the Soviet Union
1991 disestablishments in the Soviet Union
Former socialist republics